Song Painter is the debut album by singer-songwriter and actor Mac Davis, released in 1970. It was arranged and conducted by Artie Butler. The tracks "Whoever Finds This, I Love You" and "Half and Half" (the latter with the subtitle "Song for Sarah") would later reappear on Davis' 1972 album Baby Don't Get Hooked on Me. Artie Butler was credited for arrangements and conducting.

Track list 
All tracks written by Mac Davis, except where noted.

United States issue

Canadian issue

Charts 
Album

Singles

References

Mac Davis albums
Columbia Records albums
1970 debut albums
Albums produced by Jimmy Bowen